Szeben was an administrative county (comitatus) of the Kingdom of Hungary. Its territory is now in central Romania (southern Transylvania). The capital of the county was Nagyszeben (present-day Sibiu).

Geography

Szeben County shared borders with Romania and the Hungarian counties Hunyad, Alsó-Fehér, Nagy-Küküllő, and Fogaras. The river Olt flowed through the county. Its area was  around 1910.

History
Szeben County was formed in 1876, when the administrative structure of Transylvania was changed. It included the former Saxon seats of Hermannstadt/Sibiu, Mühlbach/Sebeș, Reussmarkt/Miercurea, and (most of) Nocrich, as well as parts of Alsó-Fehér and Felső-Fehér counties. In 1920, by the Treaty of Trianon, the county became part of Romania. Its territory lies in the present Romanian counties Sibiu and Alba (the area around Sebeș).

Demographics

Subdivisions

In the early 20th century, the subdivisions of Szeben county were:

Notes

References 

Kingdom of Hungary counties in Transylvania